The Special Chloroform Committee of the British Medical Association (sometimes referred to as the "Third Chloroform Committee" ) was established in 1901 following the annual meeting of the British Medical Association and it produced its last final report 1910.

The committee was instigated to investigate chloroform which was a subject of great interest to the profession and the public at the time.

The committee was started with a budget of £100 and the committee was chaired by Dr. A. D. Waller, F.R.S., and consisted of Dr. Barr, Dr. Dudley Buxton, Sit Victor Horsley, Dr. Sherrington and Dr Walker (and later Mr. A. Vernon Hardcourt and Professor Dunstan) "to investigate methods of quantitatively determining the presence of chloroform in the air and the living body".

Final report 
In their final report the committee stated that Chloroform doses above 2% were unsafe as cardiac arrest occurred under inhibition of the vagus nerve.
They also deemed these inhalers suitable for giving accurate measures of chloroform:
 Snow's Inhaler
 Charrière's Inhaler
 Duroy's Anaesthesiometer
 Junker's Inhaler (modified by Krohne and others)
 Clover's Chloroform Inhaler
 Paul Bert's Apparatus
 Dubois's Machine
 Harcourt's Regulator
 Roth-Dräger
 Levy's Inhaler
 Waller's Wick Inhaler
 Waller's Balance Inhaler
 Collingwood's Inhaler

References 

Anesthesiology organizations
1901 establishments in the United Kingdom